The 2005 Karl Schäfer Memorial (also known as the Vienna Cup) took place from October 14 through 17, 2005 at the Albert Schultz Ice Rink. Skaters competed in the disciplines of men's singles, ladies' singles, pair skating, and ice dancing.

It was the final Olympic qualifying competition for the 2006 Winter Olympics. Skaters who placed high enough qualified a spot to the Olympics for their country; there was no individual skater qualification. Countries who had already qualified a spot to the Olympics at the 2005 World Figure Skating Championships were not eligible to qualify more spots here, and their results were discounted from the overall results when allotting spots to countries. Unlike at the World Championships, where countries could qualify more than one spot depending on the placement of the skater, at this competition, countries who qualified were allotted only one spot to the Olympics, regardless of placement.

Qualified countries
There were six spots available in men's singles and pairs, eight spots in ladies' singles, and five in ice dancing. The following countries qualified skaters in the following disciplines.

Some countries were later given spots based on their performance at this competition after countries who had qualified Olympic spots informed the ISU that they would not be filled.

Results

Men

Ladies

Pairs

Ice dancing

External links
 2005 Karl Schäfer Memorial results
 ISU: Olympic Qualifying Competition – Vienna (AUT)

Karl Schafer Memorial, 2005
Karl Schäfer Memorial
Karl Schafer Memorial